Baru is an extinct genus of Australian mekosuchine crocodilian. It was semi-aquatic, around 4 m (13 ft) in length. Being semi-aquatic its habitat was around fresh pools of water in wet forests, ambushing their prey, much like modern species. The word Baru is Aboriginal and means "crocodile's ancestor".

Fossils have been found in Australia at Riversleigh in north-western Queensland and Alcoota in the Northern Territory.

Species 
There are currently three valid species within the genus Baru.
The type species B. darrowi is known from the Middle Miocene of the Northern Territory and is the largest reaching size of 4–5 m in length.
It is named after English actor Paul Darrow.
Two older species, B. huberi and B. wickeni are known from the Late Oligocene Etadunna Formation of Queensland.

In 2009, a Baru skull had been found at the Alcoota fossil site about 200km (125 miles) from Alice Springs, in the Northern Territory (NT) of Australia. It was thought to belong to a known reptile of the Baru genus, but that has been updated with new study which claims this is a new species, which is expected to be named in 2022.

Phylogeny
A 2018 tip dating study by Lee & Yates simultaneously using morphological, molecular (DNA sequencing), and stratigraphic (fossil age) data established the inter-relationships within Crocodylia. The cladogram below shows the placement of Baru within Mekosuchinae:

References

External links
Australia's Lost Kingdoms
Reconstructing Dead Aussie Crocs

Mekosuchinae
Oligocene crocodylomorphs
Miocene crocodylomorphs
Riversleigh fauna
Cenozoic reptiles of Australia
Crocodiles of Australia
Prehistoric pseudosuchian genera